The 2002 Cadillac Grand Prix of Washington, D.C. was the fifth round of the 2002 American Le Mans Series season. It took place in a 1.66 mi (2.67 km) temporary street circuit set around the streets and parking lot adjacent to Robert F. Kennedy Memorial Stadium in Washington, D.C., on July 21, 2002.

The venue was not renewed for another season due to complaints from neighbors about noise and the race was the only event of its kind held in Washington.  The event was supposed to be a recurring event, as the planners entered into a 10-year contract with the city.  Before the 2002 Grand Prix, Washington had not been home to an auto racing event for 80 years.  However, nine years later in 2011, nearby Baltimore hosted an American Le Mans Series grand prix event, the Baltimore Grand Prix, which took place in the Inner Harbor area of the city along the waterfront. Baltimore would be renewed as a site of future events.

Official results
Class winners in bold.

Statistics
 Pole Position - #1 Audi Sport North America - 1:03:287
 Fastest Lap - #2 Audi Sport North America - 1:03.883
 Distance - 374.237 km
 Average Speed - 136.052 km/h

References

External links
 
 World Sports Racing Prototypes - Race Results
 Race course schematic

W
2002 in sports in Washington, D.C.
July 2002 sports events in the United States